Emil.RuleZ! is a Hungarian pop and alternative jazz band.  Much of their music includes a light-hearted comedic component.

The group's 2001 debut album Zazie az ágyban received a gold certification from the Association of Hungarian Record Companies in 2004. The group is probably best known among English and German speakers for their 2002 single "Hello.tourist!"

Members
 Gyula "Jules" Verasztó: percussion
 András "Winkler" Hajós: lead vocals, keyboards, guitar
 György "Eldée" Hegyi: bass guitar, guitar, vocals

Discography

Albums and singles
 Zazie az ágyban (album, 2001)
 Hello.tourist! (single, 2002)
 Hisztis (album, 2003)
 zanga!zanga (album, 2005)
 Ebola Cola (Just Online, 2008)
 Gyere át! (album, 2012)

Film soundtracks
 Boldog Születésnapot! soundtrack (song "Zsebeibe zsé"; 2003)
 Magyar vándor soundtrack (song "Karaván"; 2004)

See also
Hungarian pop

External links
 Emil.RuleZ! official website

References

Hungarian jazz ensembles